The 1988 Norwich Union Grand Prix was a professional invitational snooker tournament, which took place between 17 September and 18 December 1988.

The tournament consisted of four legs featuring four players in each. The winner of these legs went to the semi-finals of the final tournament held at the Beach Plaza Hotel in Monte Carlo, Monaco. Steve Davis won the final tournament beating Jimmy White 5–4 in the final.

Main draw

Group Stage 1

Group Stage 2

Group Stage 3

Group Stage  4

Final

References

Norwich Union Grand Prix
Norwich Union Grand Prix
Norwich Union Grand Prix
Norwich Union Grand Prix